Thomas H. Maguire (January 11, 1877 – March 5, 1915) was an American football coach and physician.  He served as the head football coach at Boston College for one season, in 1909, compiling a record of 3–4–1.

Early life
Maguire was born on January 11, 1877, in South Boston to Daniel F. and Susan F. Maguire. He attended Boston Latin School and was a member of the school's football team. He played quarterback in 1893 and running back in 1894 and 1895. He was also the team's punter. In 1895 he was the team captain.

After graduating from Boston Latin, Maguire attended Harvard College and Harvard Medical School.

Medical career
Shortly after graduating from medical school, Maguire began his own practice in Dorchester. He was also a member of the staff at Carney Hospital.

Coaching career
Maguire coached football at Boston Latin from 1901 to 1906. On September 27, 1909, the Boston College Athletic Association announced that Maguire would be the school's football coach. B.C. went 3–4–1 that season.

Personal life and death
In October 1910, Maguire married Margaret G. Henry of Dorchester.

In February 1915, Maguire developed pneumonia. He died one week later at his home in Dorchester. He was survived by his wife and one daughter, Marguerite.

Head coaching record

References

1877 births
1915 deaths
Boston College Eagles football coaches
High school football coaches in Massachusetts
Harvard Medical School alumni
Sportspeople from Boston
Physicians from Massachusetts
Deaths from pneumonia in Massachusetts